Vilsteren is a village in the municipality of Ommen in the Dutch province of Overijssel. It is situated just off the left bank of the Vecht in between Dalfsen and Ommen, about 17 kilometres east of the provincial capital of Zwolle.

History
Vilsteren is an esdorp which was first mentioned in 1233 as Hermanno de Vilsteren. In 1381, a manor house was established in the village. The current Huis Vilsteren dates from 1908. A clandestine church was built in the estate during the Reformation, and Vilsteren is one of the few villages to remain Roman Catholic in what is now the Protestant Bible Belt. The Saint Willibrord Church was completed in 1817. In 1840, it was home to 146 people.

Gallery

References

Populated places in Overijssel
Ommen